Rix may refer to:

Places
 Rix, Jura, a commune in France
 Rix, Nièvre, a commune in France

People
 Rix (surname)
 Rix Robinson (1789–1875), Michigan pioneer

Other uses
 Rix, a Gaulish word meaning "king"; cognate with the ancient Gaelic word Rí, as well as the Latin Rex and the Sanskrit Rājan
 Baron Rix, a British life peerage in Whitehall
 Rix Centre, a British charitable organization
 J.R. Rix & Sons Ltd, a fuel, oil, and shipping company
 Reykjavik Internet Exchange (RIX), an Internet Exchange Point in Reykjavík, Iceland
 Riga International Airport (IATA code RIX), in Latvia

See also
 Ricks (disambiguation)
 Rick (disambiguation)
 RIXS, resonant inelastic X-ray scattering 
 Rixe, German bicycle/moped/motorcycle factory